KLKR may refer to:

 KLKR (FM), a radio station (89.3 FM) licensed to serve Elko, Nevada, United States
 Lancaster County Airport (ICAO code KLKR)